The individual dressage event, part of the equestrian program at the 2004 Summer Olympics, was held from 19 to 25 August 2004 at the Olympic Equestrian Centre on the outskirts of Markópoulo, in the Attica region of Greece.  Like all other equestrian events, the dressage competition was mixed gender, with both male and female athletes competing in the same division.  53 horse and rider pairs were entered.

Medalists

Results

Inspection
The inspection was held on 19 August.  49 of the horses were passed on initial inspection.  Three were re-inspected before being accepted, and one was disqualified.

Re-inspections:
 Wels, ridden by Friedrich Gaulhofer of Austria
 Gabana, ridden by Louisa Hill of New Zealand
 Condor, ridden by Elena Sidneva of Russia

Disqualification:
 Heros, ridden by Alaia Demiropoulou of Greece.

Grand Prix Test
The first round was the Grand Prix Test.  Each of the 52 pairs went through a series of movements in the sandy arena, with judges in five different positions observing the movements and giving percentage scores based on the execution of the movements.  The total score for the round was the average of the five judges' scores.  The top 25 pairs advanced to the second round, though no more than 3 pairs from any nation could advance.

Grand Prix Special
The Grand Prix Special Test was the second round.  It was similar to the first, though the time allotted was shorter.  The score from this round was averaged with the score from the Grand Prix Test, with the top fifteen pairs advancing to the final round.  Individual judges' scores were given in 1/5 point increments.

Grand Prix Freestyle
The final round of dressage competition was the Grand Prix Freestyle Test.  Fifteen pairs competed in this round, in which they designed their own program of movements set to music.  They were judged on both execution of the movements (technical) and how well their performance matched the music (artistic).  Each of the five judges gave a score from 0 to 10 in both categories, with the final score for the round being the sum of those ten scores.  This score was then averaged with the scores from the other two rounds to determine final ranking.

Qualifying athletes

References

Individual dressage